Robert "Bob" Collins was an African-American man who was lynched in Summit, Pike County, Mississippi by a mob of about 100 people on June 20, 1922. According to the United States Senate Committee on the Judiciary it was the 32nd of 61 lynchings during 1922 in the United States.

Background

There was an attempted assault of a young woman near Summit, Mississippi. Months later, in Ponchatoula, Louisiana, the section foreman of the Illinois Central Railroad, F. L. Blake "captured" Robert Collins and notified Marshal E.E. Blount of Summit, Mississippi. Marshal Blount travelled to Ponchatoula and escorted Collins across the State line to the house of the victim. Once there he allegedly confessed to the crime.

Lynching
When word spread that Marshal E.E. Blount had a man in custody a crowd of 100 men gathered. They were able to seize Collins and took him to the scene of the attempted attack where he was hanged from a branch of a tree.

See also
There were eight lynchings in Mississippi in 1922 only topped by Texas (16) and Georgia (11).

Alex Smith was a 60-year-old African-American man who was lynched in Gulfport, Mississippi on March 22, 1922.
Will Bell was lynched on January 29, 1922, in Pontotoc, Mississippi.
Will Thrasher was lynched on February 1, 1922, in Crystal Springs, Mississippi.
William Baker was lynched on March 8, 1922, in Aberdeen, Mississippi. 
John Steelman was lynched on August 23, 1922, in Lambert, Mississippi.

Bibliography 
Notes

References

 

1922 riots
1922 in Mississippi
African-American history of Mississippi
Deaths by person in Mississippi
Lynching deaths in Mississippi
December 1922 events
Protest-related deaths
Racially motivated violence against African Americans
Riots and civil disorder in Mississippi
White American riots in the United States